VLS-1 V01 was the first launch of the VLS-1 rocket that took place on November 2, 1997, from the Alcantara Space Center with the objective of putting the SCD-2A satellite into orbit. The launch was unsuccessful after the rocket was remotely destroyed due to deviation from its trajectory.

Background and goals
The VLS-1 rocket was originally proposed in 1979 as part of the  having its first launch originally planned for 1989, then in 1994, 1995, and finally in 1997 it had its first prototype ready within "Operation Brazil", with the objective of placing in orbit the SCD-2A satellite, developed by INPE, and to test the vehicle in flight. The first prototype of the VLS was 80% Brazilian technology.

The satellite would be placed in an orbit at an altitude of 750 kilometers. On July 1 the equipment was sent to the Alcântara base and both the rocket and the satellite were ready by August 1997. The launch cost R$16 million (US$ ) and aimed to show potential customers the reliability of the Brazilian rocket, which for US$6.5 million, was cheaper than the U.S. rocket Pegasus for US$15 million.

The  barred the Press and civil authorities from attending the launch, claiming "security issues and lack of infrastructure" for receiving the press and guests at the base. As a result, President Fernando Henrique Cardoso had his visit to the base moved forward to October 21. Initially the launch was to take place in early September; however, delays at the center and the fact that the rocket was struck by lightning postponed the preparations. AEB sought to work with Embratel and Telebrás to broadcast the launch nationwide.

Launch

1st attempt
The launch was supposed to take place on October 26, 1997, but was delayed in the early hours of the same day due to a malfunction in the doopler radar, made by Thomson, which would track the launch and identify the satellite's orbit. If the next attempt did not occur by the end of the planned window (November 10), the rocket would have to be put into a horizontal position due to the instability of its fuel.

2nd attempt
On November 2, during the countdown the timer had to be paused for about 15 minutes due to a plane crossing the restricted airspace.

At 12h25m a.m. (UTC) the rocket was launched with a mass of 50 tons at the time of launch. Within about a minute the technicians noticed a problem with strap-on booster D, which caused the rocket to climb at an incline. Although the vehicle corrected the inclination, about seven tons of dead weight unbalanced the ascent, which led, 65 seconds after launch, to the remote destruction of a satellite worth $5 million and a $6.5 million rocket. It was later revealed that of the four boosters, one was not engaged, causing it to go off course. At the time of the destruction, the rocket was going 700 km/h.

A 15-minute pause was taken in the picture chain operated by Radiobrás and broadcast to auditoriums with guests in Brasilia, São Luís and São José dos Campos. On the return of the broadcast, Colonel Thiago da Silva announced the failure.

Aftermath
Luiz Gylvan Meira Filho, then president of the Brazilian Space Agency, noted that the fact that the rocket sought to correct its trajectory was an engineering success. The investigation pointed to a malfunctioning "mechanical safety device", that hindered the transmission of the pyrotechnic order, as responsible for the accident.

A professor at the Aeronautics Institute of Technology, speaking anonymously to the media, said that the accident could have been avoided if the entire boosters assembly had been tested in an integrated manner, but the CTA tests only addressed each strap-on booster separately. The "integrated test", with all four boosters, only occurred with the launch, contrary to what the ITA had advised. The military was warned about the risk of an accident months before the launch. Not all the tests were performed on the safety mechanism responsible for the accident due to the pressure to get the launch done on time.

The next launch occurred in 1999, ending with the remote destruction of the vehicle and the SACI-2 satellite about three minutes after liftoff.

See also
Brazilian space program

References

Notes

Bibliography

(Chronological order)

Test spaceflights
Satellite launch failures
Rocket launches in 1997
1997 in Brazil